CHAK 382 GB Sarwarwali is a village of about 5,000 people situated near the city of Jaranwala in the Faisalabad District of Pakistan. There are many castes living this village, such as Dar, Noon, Khichi, and Koras. It has two primary schools: A girls' primary School and a boys' primary school.

Surroundings 
It is situated left to the Gugera Branch Canal on the north side and Chak No. 357 GB on north-western side by crossing Gogera Branch. Eastern side near Thatti Gujran. There is a small canal which distributes water to many villages of the Dan Abad circle. Across the canal, there is a village named Chak No.381 G.B. to the north.

Map

References

Villages in Faisalabad District